The bicolored woodgrain (Morrisonia evicta) is a species of moth of the family Noctuidae. It is found from Nova Scotia to Virginia, west to Texas and Manitoba.

The wingspan is 30–37 mm. Adults are on wing from April to May.

Larvae have been reared on Prunus virginiana.

External links
Images
Bug Guide

Hadeninae
Moths of North America